The 2007 South Staffordshire District Council election to the South Staffordshire District Council took place in May 2007, with the  Featherstone and Shareshill Ward results delayed following the death of a candidate. All 49 seats were up for election, 41 of which went to Conservative Party candidates. 13 of the 14 seats won unopposed went to Conservatives.

Election result

Ward results

References

South Staffordshire
South Staffordshire District Council elections
2000s in Staffordshire